Pyrausta minimalis is a moth in the family Crambidae. It was described by George Hampson in 1903. It is found in Gujarat, India.

References

Moths described in 1903
minimalis
Moths of Asia